Martin A. Kamarck (born May 15, 1949) is an American businessman who served as Chairman and President of the Export–Import Bank of the United States from 1996 to 1997. He previously served as Vice Chairman of the Export–Import Bank of the United States from 1993 to 1996.

References

1949 births
Living people
New York (state) Democrats